Gråsteinsnosi is a mountain on the border of Agder and Vestfold og Telemark counties in southern Norway. Gråsteinsnosi is located on the border between the municipalities of Bykle (in Agder) and Tokke (in Vestfold og Telemark).

References

Mountains of Agder
Mountains of Vestfold og Telemark
Bykle
Tokke